Kermia sagenaria is a species of sea snail, a marine gastropod mollusk in the family Raphitomidae.

Description
The length of the shell varies between 5.5 mm and 8 mm.

Distribution
This marine species occurs off Easter Island, the Austral Islands and the Philippines.

References

External links
 Tröndlé, J. E. A. N., and Michel Boutet. "Inventory of marine molluscs of French Polynesia." Atoll Research Bulletin (2009)
 Rehder H. A. (1980). The marine mollusks of Easter Island (Isla de Pascua) and Sala y Gómez. Smithsonian Contributions to Zoology. 289: 1-167, 15 figs, 14 pls
 
 Gastropods.com: Kermia sagenaria

sagenaria
Gastropods described in 1980